KCWR (107.1 FM) is an American radio station broadcasting a classic country format. Licensed to Bakersfield, California, United States, the station is owned by the Buck Owens Production Company.

History
The station was assigned call sign "KTIE" on October 18, 1989.  On January 17, 1997, the station changed its call sign to the current "KCWR".

References

External links

CWR
Country radio stations in the United States
Radio stations established in 1991